The Guild-Verner House is a historic mansion in Tuscaloosa, Alabama, U.S..

History
The house was built for Dr. James Guild, a surgeon, in 1822. In 1881, Guild sold it to Henry Snow, who sold it to Dr. Charles Snow. It was inherited by his daughter Julia Penn and her husband, W. G. B. Pearson, who served as a member of the Alabama House of Representatives. In 1911, it was purchased by C. B. Verner, who also served as a member of the Alabama House of Representatives. It was subsequently used as an office and a restaurant, until it became unoccupied.

Architectural significance
The house has been listed on the National Register of Historic Places since December 4, 1973.

References

Houses on the National Register of Historic Places in Alabama
Georgian architecture in Alabama
Houses completed in 1822
Houses in Tuscaloosa, Alabama